is a Japanese light novel series written by Taro Hitsuji and illustrated by Kiyotaka Haimura. It was published in five volumes between July 2018 and January 2020. A manga adaptation, illustrated by Yuzuriha, was serialized in Monthly Young Ace from January 2019 to May 2020 and published on two volumes.

Characters

Media

Light novels
The light novels are written by Taro Hitsuji and illustrated by Kiyotaka Haimura. Fujimi Shobo published the first volume under their Fujimi Fantasia Bunko imprint on July 20, 2018. The series ended in its fifth volume, which was released on January 18, 2020.

At Anime NYC 2018, Yen Press announced they licensed the series for English publication.

Volume list

Manga
A manga adaptation, illustrated by Yuzuriha, started serialization in Kadokawa Shoten's Monthly Young Ace on January 4, 2019. The series concluded in Monthly Young Ace on May 2, 2020. The individual chapters were collected into two tankōbon volumes.

In March 2020, Yen Press announced they would also publish the manga in English.

Volume list

Reception
Sean Gaffney from A Case Suitable 
for Treatment praised the first volume for its fights, stating it was a good read overall. Demelza from Anime UK News also praised the first volume for its plot and illustrations.

Antonio Mireles from The Fandom Post praised the first volume of the manga adaptation, though also noted that it ends a bit prematurely. Grant Jones from Anime News Network was more critical, calling it incredibly generic.

See also
Akashic Records of Bastard Magic Instructor, another light novel series by Taro Hitsuji

References

External links
 Official website 
 

2018 Japanese novels
Adventure anime and manga
Japanese adventure novels
Fantasy anime and manga
Japanese fantasy novels
Fujimi Fantasia Bunko
Kadokawa Shoten manga
Modern Arthurian fiction
Seinen manga
Yen Press titles